Daniel McGowan (8 November 1924 – 25 April 1994) was an Irish footballer who played in the Football League for West Ham United.

McGowan moved from League of Ireland club Shelbourne to West Ham United in 1948, following a recommendation from Shels manager Charlie Turner, who had played for the Hammers before the war. He played as an inside forward, later converting to wing half. There, he joined an Irish contingent of players that included Tommy Moroney and Frank O'Farrell, who had been recruited from Cork United.

McGowan played 88 times for The Hammers, scoring 9 goals, before moving to Southern League club Chelmsford City in 1954. After a season, he moved on to Folkestone Town of the Kent League.

He made three international appearances for the Republic of Ireland national football team, all games in 1949.

After his retirement from football, he worked at the London Electricity Board for 22 years. He died in 1994 after suffering from Parkinson's disease. His funeral took place in Canning Town and was attended by former teammate John Dick.

References

External links
 West Ham stats site
 Ireland international team stats site

1924 births
1994 deaths
Association footballers from Dublin (city)
Association football wing halves
Association football inside forwards
Republic of Ireland association footballers
Ireland (FAI) international footballers
Shelbourne F.C. players
West Ham United F.C. players
Chelmsford City F.C. players
Folkestone F.C. players
League of Ireland players
English Football League players
Neurological disease deaths in England
Deaths from Parkinson's disease